Mbongeni Khumalo (born 15 July 1976) is a South African performance poet, poet and writer. He was born in Soweto. His poems and short stories have appeared in New Coin, Global Fire, Tribute, Timbila and Botsotso. In 1999 he won a merit award from the English Academy of South Africa.

Poetry 
 Apocrypha, Timbila Poetry Project and Bila Publishers (2003)
 Throbbing Ink, (co-author) Timbila Poetry Project (2003)

References

South African male poets
Living people
1976 births
21st-century South African poets
21st-century South African male writers